Bimbister is a village on the Orkney Islands, Scotland. The A986 is the main road through the village. The Bronze Age cemetery, the Knowes of Trotty, which includes twelve surviving burial mounds, lies to the east of the village. Bimbister is within the parish of Birsay and Harray.

See also
Knowes of Trotty  
Prehistoric Scotland
Liddle Burnt Mound

References

External links

The Megalithic Portal - Appiehouse Standing Stone
The Megalithic Portal - Knowes of Trotty
The Megalithic Portal - Woodwyn Cairn
Orkneyjar - Knowes of Trotty
Canmore - Bimbister, Upper House Farm site record

Villages on Mainland, Orkney